Digital United, commonly known as SeedNet, is one of the major Internet Service Provider based in Taipei, Taiwan.  

It was first a Project SEED (Software Engineering Environment Development) sponsored by the Ministry of Economic Affairs and operated by Institute for Information Industry (III) to push-start Taiwan local Internet market. 

The company Digital United was then officially found in 1998, shareholders include The Ministry of Economic, Institute for Information Industry (III) and 7-11.

See also
 List of companies of Taiwan

External links 
 

Internet service providers
Telecommunications companies of Taiwan